Eirik Asante Gayi (born 23 January 2001) is a Norwegian football midfielder who currently plays for Brage.

He played youth and senior football for Eidanger IL before joining Odd's junior setup. In May 2020 he signed with Odd's first team on a 1.5-year deal. He made his Eliteserien debut in December 2020 against Molde.

References

2001 births
Living people
People from Porsgrunn
Norwegian people of Ghanaian descent
Norwegian footballers
Odds BK players
Eliteserien players
Association football midfielders